The 2018 Syracuse Orange men's soccer team represented Syracuse University during the 2018 NCAA Division I men's soccer season. It was the program's 95th season and 6th in the Atlantic Coast Conference.  The Orange were led by Ian McIntyre, who was in his ninth year.

Background

The 2017 Syracuse men's soccer team finished the season with a 6–8–4 overall record and a 0–6–2 ACC record.  The Orange were seeded twelfth–overall in the 2017 ACC Men's Soccer Tournament, where they lost to Clemson in the first round.  The Orange were not invited to the 2017 NCAA Division I Men's Soccer Tournament.

At the end of the 2017 season, one Orange men's soccer player was selected in the 2018 MLS SuperDraft: Mo Adams.

Player movement

Players leaving

Players arriving

Squad

Roster 

Updated: August 3, 2018

Team management

Source:

Schedule 
Source: 

|-
!colspan=6 style=""| Exhibition
|-

|-

|-

|-
!colspan=6 style=""| Regular season
|-

|-
!colspan=6 style=""| ACC Tournament

|-
!colspan=6 style=""| NCAA Tournament

Awards and honors

Rankings

2019 MLS Super Draft

Source:

References 

Syracuse Orange men's soccer seasons
Syracuse Orange
Syracuse men's soccer
Syracuse Orange
Syracuse